Brignetti is an Italian surname. Notable people with the surname include: 

Duilio Brignetti (1926–1993), Italian modern pentathlete
Raffaello Brignetti (1921–1978), Italian writer

Italian-language surnames